Richard Louveteau Glasspool (1884-1949) was a British businessman and philanthropist, who established the Glasspool Trust in 1939.

References

1884 births
1949 deaths
20th-century British businesspeople
People from Eastleigh
20th-century British philanthropists